Fanbyak is a minor language of Ambrym Island, Vanuatu.

Name
Fanbyak takes its name from the village of the same name, where it used to be spoken. Fanbyak village has been abandoned, with residents now living among speakers of North Ambrym.

Lynch and Crowley (2001) called the language "Orkon". However, it appears that Orkon, spoken in the Orkon village, really referred to a lect (either a dialect or a separate language) distinct from Fanbak. Nothing is known on Orkon proper, which is now extinct.

References

External links
 Fanbyak DoReCo corpus compiled by Michael Franjieh. Audio recordings of narrative texts with transcriptions time-aligned at the phone level, translations, and - for some texts - time-aligned morphological annotations.

Penama languages
Languages of Vanuatu